Moulay Yusef ben Hassan, born in Meknes on 1882 and died in Fes on 1927, was the Alaouite sultan of Morocco from 1912 to 1927. He was the son of Hassan ben Mohammed.

Life

Moulay Yusef was born in the city of Meknes to Sultan Hassan I. The identity of his mother is conflicted, some sources state that Lalla Um al-Khair who's last name is not recorded is his mother, since she is the mother of his twin brother Moulay Mohammed al-Tahar. Other sources state Lalla Ruqiya al-Amrani as his mother, her son is Sultan Moulay Abdelaziz. She often is confused to be Ayesha the Circassian or Georgian slave bought in Syria by the vizir Sidi Gharnat and brought to his father's harem circa 1876.

Moulay Yusef was the youngest of Sultan Hassan I's sons. He inherited the throne from his brother, Sultan Moulay Abdelhafid, who abdicated after the Treaty of Fez (1912), which made Morocco a French protectorate. He was a member of the Alaouite Dynasty.

Moulay Yusef's reign was turbulent and marked with frequent uprisings against Spain and France. The most serious of these were a Berber uprising led by Abd el-Krim in the Rif Mountains,  in the Spanish-controlled area in the north, who managed to establish a republic; and the uprising of Sahraoui tribes in the south, led by Ahmed al-Hiba, the son of Ma al-'Aynayn. The Riffian conflict managed to reach the French-controlled area, prompting the creation of a Franco-Spanish military coalition that finally defeated the rebels in 1925. To ensure his own safety, Yusef moved the court from Fez to Rabat, which has served as the capital of the country ever since.

Yusef's reign came to an abrupt end when he died suddenly of uremia in 1927. He was succeeded by his son Sidi Mohammed. He was buried in the royal necropolis of the Moulay Abdallah Mosque.

Honours
  Grand Cross of the Order of the Crown (Kingdom of Belgium)
  Grand Cordon of the Order of Muhammad Ali (Kingdom of Egypt)
  Grand Cross of the Legion of Honour (France, 1912)
  Grand Cross of the Order of Saints Maurice and Lazarus (Kingdom of Italy)
  Grand Cross of the Order of Isabella the Catholic (Kingdom of Spain)
  Order of Blood (Tunisia)
  Honorary Grand Cross of the Order of St Michael and St George (GCMG) (United Kingdom, 12 November 1917)

See also
 List of Kings of Morocco
 History of Morocco

References and links

 Morocco Alaoui dynasty
 History of Morocco

1882 births
1927 deaths
'Alawi dynasty
Sultans of Morocco
Honorary Knights Grand Cross of the Order of St Michael and St George
Grand Crosses of the Order of the Crown (Belgium)
People from Meknes
People from Fez, Morocco
Moroccan people of Arab descent
Knights Grand Cross of the Order of Isabella the Catholic
Knights Grand Cross of the Order of Saints Maurice and Lazarus
Grand Croix of the Légion d'honneur
Flag designers
19th-century Arabs